Kalleh Kaz (also known as Kalleh Gaz and Kateh Gaz) is a village in Sangan Rural District, in the Central District of Khash County, Sistan and Baluchestan Province, Iran. At the 2006 census, its population was 67, in 13 families.

References 

Populated places in Khash County